Les Dalton dans le blizzard is a Lucky Luke adventure written by Goscinny and illustrated by Morris. It is the twenty-second book in the series and it was originally published in French in 1963 and in English by Cinebook in 2009 as The Daltons in the Blizzard.

Synopsis 
Once more, the Daltons escape. This time, Joe has an idea to avoid Lucky Luke. They will cross the border and settle in Canada. To be sure that Luke will not follow their lead, they pretend to be the Jones brothers: Frank, Louis, Robert and Jim Jones (the latter, for a simplistic reason, will turn into Imbecile Jones). The trouble is that everyone recognizes the Daltons and Lucky Luke has no trouble following their lead, especially since a witness told him they were going to Canada. The Daltons manage to cross the border. They arrive in the middle of winter: it is cold and there is snow on the ground.

On the day of their arrival, they attack a local saloon and learn that there is only one policeman in the area, Corporal Winston Pendergast. The latter, who lives with a certain Grospierre, has just met Lucky Luke who, in turn, has just crossed the Canadian border. Both men learn the inn's attack, which makes Daltons criminals in Canada. They decide to join forces to stop them. They get themselves on their track, which is easy because it is punctuated by attacks from banks. In a town, Lucky Luke manages to arrest William, Jack and Averell who are released soon after by Joe. The Daltons decide to flee to the north.

They arrive in Golden Glow where the night lasts six months. Joe's first goal is to buy the saloon where prospectors come to spend their gold. For this, they organize a boxing bout arranged between Joe and Averell. Jack and William will bet for Joe and he will win. Averell, however, does not agree and knocks out Joe during the fight. When William succeeds in making him listen to reason and Joe wins, the spectators ransack the saloon. The owner decides to leave the country, disgusted, and the property eventually becomes property of the Daltons. That's when Lucky Luke and Corporal Pendergast arrive in town. After having successfully mounted the local population against them, the Daltons flee. Surrounded by wolves in the forest, they surrender to Lucky Luke, who returns them to the U.S.

Characters 

 Canadians
 Corporal Winston Pendergast: Corporal of the Canadian Mounted Police, if his authority is recognized by his fellow citizens, it has little effect on the Daltons.
 Grospierre: Canadian trapper, rescues Rintincan from a trap, welcomes Lucky Luke, it is at his place that he meets the corporal.
 Minceruisseau: Canadian lumberjack, who employs Daltons as lumberjacks, in view of the results as a man of households and cooks.
 Americans
 Averell Dalton: The biggest and the dumbest, always hungry.
 Jack Dalton: Smaller than Averell, but taller than William.
 William Dalton: Smaller than Jack, but taller than Joe, with Jack they make up the "Greek chorus".
 Joe Dalton: The smallest, the most bitter, "stupid, (...) selfish, conceited, cruel and greedy", he harbors an unquenchable hatred of Lucky Luke.

External links
Lucky Luke official site album index 
Goscinny website on Lucky Luke

Comics by Morris (cartoonist)
Lucky Luke albums
1963 graphic novels
Works by René Goscinny
Comics set in Canada